West Catholic High School is a private Catholic college preparatory secondary school in Grand Rapids, Michigan (U.S.). It opened in 1962 with loans from Kenowa Hills Public Schools. It is located within the Catholic Diocese of Grand Rapids.

Academics 
West Catholic has been honored each year since 2008 as one of the top Catholic high schools in the United States by the Cardinal Newman Society. With sixteen Advanced Placement courses taught on campus and Dual Enrollment credits through a partnership with Aquinas College also offered on-site, the Washington Post listed West Catholic as one of the most challenging private high schools in the United States for 2014, 2015, and 2016.

Athletics
Grand Rapids West Catholic High School is member of Ottawa-Kent Conference Blue Division.  Though the 2007-2008 school year, West Catholic was member of Grand Rapids City League.  West Catholic is also a school of the Michigan High School Athletic Association (MHSAA).

State Championships (MHSAA unless noted):
 1970 Boys' Football - Class B
 1970 Boys' Cross Country - Class B
 1979 Girls' Basketball - Class B
 1984 Girls' Gymnastics - Open Class
 1990 Girls' Basketball - Class B
 2003 Boys' Across Country - Division 3 
 2004 Boys' Team Track n' Field - Division 3
 2008 Boys' Team Track n' Field - Division 3
 2008 Girls' Team Track n' Field - Division 3
 2009 Boys' Team Track n' Field - Division 3 (MITCA)
 2010 Boys' Football - Division 5
 2013 Boys' Football - Division 5
 2014 Boys' Football - Division 5
 2015 Boys' Football - Division 5
 2016 Boys' Football - Division 5
 2017 Boys' Football - Division 5
 2022 Boys' Football - Division 6

Student life
The Westword is West Catholic's student newspaper. It is published on a monthly basis by members of the Journalism class each month. The Westword, a staple of student life at West Catholic, won Spartan Awards, the highest honor awarded by the Michigan Interscholastic Press Association (MIPA). The name, Westword, is a pun on westward, which refers to a direction.

Notable alumni
 Greg Meyer, 1983 Boston Marathon champion

References

External links
 

Roman Catholic Diocese of Grand Rapids
Catholic secondary schools in Michigan
Educational institutions established in 1962
Schools in Grand Rapids, Michigan
1962 establishments in Michigan